Thomas Fennell may refer to:

 Thomas Fennell (politician) (1928–2012), member of the Parliament of Canada
 Thomas McCarthy Fennell (1841–1914), Irish prisoner
 Tom Fennell (1875–1936), American football coach
 Thomas F. Fennell (1904–1991), American college football player

See also
 Fennell, surname